Bond v The Queen, was a significant case decided in the High Court of Australia regarding the power of the Commonwealth DPP to institute appeals in state courts.

Background 
Alan Bond had pleaded guilty in the Supreme Court of Western Australia to two charges of failing to act honestly in his capacity as an officer of a company, with intent to defraud the company and its shareholders. He was sentenced to a total of four years imprisonment. The Director of Public Prosecutions appealed his sentence to the Court of Criminal Appeal, of which the court allowed the appeal and sentenced Alan Bond to seven years imprisonment.

Alan Bond appealed to the High Court on the grounds that the Director of Public Prosecutions didn't have the authority to appeal the sentence imposed on him.

References 

High Court of Australia cases
2000 in case law
2000 in Australian law
Australian criminal law